Godine nestvarne is the first studio album by Croatian recording artist Nina Badrić, released in 1995 by Croatia Records.

Track listing

References

Nina Badrić albums
1995 albums